Moira Johnston is a women's rights activist who, by walking through New York City topless, campaigns to raise awareness that it is legal for women, as it is for men, to go topless anywhere in the state of New York.  She is from Havertown, Pennsylvania. She also supports breast cancer awareness. The state of New York made it legal for women to go out topless in 1992. She was arrested once before being released. She has also demonstrated in Philadelphia, Pennsylvania.

See also
Go Topless Day

References

1983 births
Living people
American women's rights activists
People from Delaware County, Pennsylvania
Social nudity advocates